The Westwoods Trails is an extensive hiking trail system in Guilford, Connecticut. The preserve extends across land owned by the Guilford Land Conservation Trust, which also owns many other land parcels across the town which provide hiking trails, and the State of Connecticut. The trails are accessible for walking, running, and mountain biking. Hunting is only allowed on state land during the season.

Trail description

The Westwoods Trails is primarily used for hiking, mountain biking, backpacking, picnicking, and in the winter, snowshoeing.

Portions of the trail are suitable for, and are used for, cross-country skiing and geocaching. Site-specific activities enjoyed along the route include bird watching, hunting (very limited), fishing, horseback riding,  bouldering and rock climbing (limited).

Trail route

Trail communities

The Westwoods Trails are completely contained in the western section of Guilford, Connecticut.
It is very close to the Branford, Connecticut border however and the 'Green Trail' connects the WestWoods Trails to the Stony Creek Quarry Trails System in Branford, CT.

Landscape, geology, and natural environment

History and folklore
The Westwoods Trails are maintained on behalf of the land trust by the Westwoods Trails Committee.

Hiking the trail

The trails are blazed with several colors as well as shapes. Trail descriptions and maps are available from a number of commercial and non-commercial sources, and a complete guide to the WestWoods Trails is published in the Connecticut Walk Book East by the Connecticut Forest and Park Association

Weather along the route is typical of Connecticut. Conditions on exposed ridge tops and summits may be harsher during cold or stormy weather. Lightning is a hazard on exposed summits and ledges during thunderstorms. Snow is common in the winter and may necessitate the use of snowshoes. Ice can form on exposed ledges and summits, making hiking dangerous without special equipment.

Biting insects can be bothersome during warm weather. Parasitic deer ticks (which are known to carry Lyme disease) are a potential hazard.
Wearing bright orange clothing during the hunting season (Fall through December) is recommended.

Conservation and maintenance of the trail corridor

See also
 Blue-Blazed Trails

References

Further reading

External links
Specific to this trail:
 Guilford Land Conservation Trust
 Westwoods Tom's Personal Website and Blog
 Granitic Rocks and Granite of the Westwoods Area in Guilford

 

Hiking trails in Connecticut
Guilford, Connecticut
Protected areas of New Haven County, Connecticut